Furze World Wonders is an American-Canadian series starring inventor and YouTuber Colin Furze, who uses extreme skills to help others with their own creations.

Produced by Canada's 9 Story Media Group, the series was first released on YouTube Red on September 28, 2017.

Episodes

References

External links
 

2017 web series debuts
YouTube Premium original series
Television series by 9 Story Media Group